Veli Kavlak (born 3 November 1988) is an Austrian former footballer who played as a midfielder. Born in Vienna, Kavlak has represented Austria at international level.

Playing style
Kavlak is a defensive box to box midfielder. At club level, he is deployed in the holding role and is key in midfield with his tireless running and endless stamina. He is also a hardworking leader and although not being known for unsportsmanlike acts, he is known to be a hatchet man in midfield. Kavlak is often accompanied by another more offensive central midfielder such as Manuel Fernandes and Oğuzhan Özyakup. At international level, however, he has most prominently featured in a more advanced position in front of a holding midfielder.

International career
On 15 August 2012 he scored against his parents' home country Turkey playing for Austria in the 3rd minute. Austria went on to win that game 2-0.

Career statistics

Club

International

International goals
Scores and results list Turkey's goal tally first.

Honours

Club
SK Rapid Wien
Austrian Bundesliga (2): 2004–05 , 2007–08

Beşiktaş J.K.
Süper Lig (2): 2015–16 , 2016–17

Personal life
Veli Kavlak was born to Turkish parents. He also holds Turkish citizenship.
He speaks Turkish fluently.

References

External links

 
 

1988 births
Living people
Footballers from Vienna
Austrian people of Turkish descent
Austrian footballers
Austrian expatriate footballers
Austria international footballers
SK Rapid Wien players
Beşiktaş J.K. footballers
Süper Lig players
Austrian Football Bundesliga players
Expatriate footballers in Turkey
Austria under-21 international footballers
Austria youth international footballers
Austrian expatriate sportspeople in Turkey
Association football midfielders